Intelsat III F-4 was a geostationary communications satellite built by TRW, it was owned by Intelsat, a company currently based in Luxembourg. The satellite had an estimated useful life of 5 years.

The Intelsat III F-4 was part of the Intelsat III series which consisted of eight satellites, which were used for retransmission of global commercial telecommunications, including live TV.

The satellite was stabilized by rotation with a minus antenna structure (its antenna was 34 inches high). It had a hydrazine propulsion system with four propellers and four tanks. Passive thermal control. With solar cells producing 178W peak, nine Ahr NiCd batteries. The load consisted of two transponders that used 12 watt TWTA amplifiers for multiple access, 1500 audio circuits or four TV channels. The Intelsat III F-1 was disabled due to launch vehicle failure. 

The satellite was successfully launched into space on May 22, 1969, by means of a Delta M vehicle from Cape Canaveral Air Force Station in Florida, United States. It had a launch mass of 293 kg.

References 

Spacecraft launched in 1969
Intelsat satellites